Guo Shan (born November 7, 1946, Beijing) is a Chinese contemporary classical pianist. She is the current Chairwoman of the Alliance of Asia-Pacific Region Orchestras and the president of China Symphony Development Foundation.

Early life
Guo Shan studied at the middle school affiliated to the Central Conservatory of Music as well as the CCOM, then higher education at the Yamaha Music Conservatory in Japan. She worked in China Motion Picture Symphony Orchestra for over 20 years and was the assistant to executive director of the orchestra since 1996. In the early 1990s she was involved in China Music Instrument Grading System as Deputy Secretary-General of CCOM Music Grading Committee. Since 2000 she was appointed Deputy Director of China National Symphony Orchestra in charge of fundraising, programming and administration, also Adjunct Secretary-General of the CSDF during which she took CNSO on tours in Australia, Germany, Japan, the Netherlands, Portugal, Spain, Taiwan and Thailand.

As the President of the CSDF and the Chairwoman of the AAPRO

Since she took over China Symphony Development Foundation in 2004 as President, she has overseen several major music campaigns on the national level including the concert commemorating the 60th anniversary of the Anti-Japanese War in 2005, Red Ribbon charity concert devoted to anti-HIV campaign in 2006, Mozart Piano and Violin Competition commemorating the 250th anniversary of Mozart held in eight cities nationwide in 2006, Youth Instrumentalist (Concerto) Competition, China Teens and Youth Symphony Orchestra Summer Camp in 2007, music tours in Germany, Austria and Czech Republic in both 2007 and 2010, relief concert devoted to the Sichuan earthquake zone for mothers and sons in 2008 where over 40 million RMB was raised for earthquake victims.

She also founded the League of CSDF consisting of initially 44 orchestra members. She was elected Chairwoman of the Alliance of Asia-Pacific Region Orchestras (AAPRO) end of 2008 during its sixth Summit.

In 2009 she presented Straits Peace Orchestra with a Taiwanese partner. The orchestra toured in Beijing, Shanghai, Shenzhen, Taipei and Kaohsiung and has won generous praise from officials including Jia Qinglin, Ma Ying-jeou and Lien Chan who were all present at the concert. The orchestra, under its new title Straits Philharmonic Orchestra, embarked on its second voyage to Taipei and Taichung in 2009 sponsored by VIA Group. At the invitation of the United Nations and initiated by Guo, AAPRO together with the Permanent Mission of China to the United Nations formed the Asia-Pacific United Orchestra and presented the “Sounds of Heaven”Concert at the UN Headquarters General Assembly Hall to inaugurate the UN Academic Impact on November 19, 2010 participated by leading musicians and soloists. This historic moment was witnessed and welcomed by H.E Dr. Asha-Rose Migiro, Deputy Secretary-General of the United Nations, together with many a distinguished audience.

References

1946 births
Living people
Chinese classical pianists
Women classical pianists
Chinese women pianists
Musicians from Beijing
People's Republic of China musicians
21st-century classical pianists
21st-century women pianists